Mayne Island is a  island in the southern Gulf Islands chain of British Columbia. It is midway between the Lower Mainland of BC and Vancouver Island, and has a population of 995. Mount Parke in the south-central heart of the island is its highest peak at 255 metres (837 feet).

History
Mayne Island was inhabited by members of the Tsartlip First Nation prior to European colonization. Several middens are present on the island, along with period articles – most notably including a   stone bowl which was stolen in 1982 and again, in 2007.

In 1794 Captain George Vancouver camped on Georgina Point where his crew left a coin and a knife found over a century later by early settlers.

In 1857 Captain George Richards of the Royal Navy surveyed the area as captain of the Royal Navy vessel HMS Plumper, naming the island after his Lieutenant Richard Charles Mayne, son of the first commissioner of the London Metropolitan Police. His journals concerning his explorations of British Columbia are important sources for early British Columbia history, as are those of his colleague in many of those explorations, Royal Engineer Lieutenant Henry Spencer Palmer.

During the Fraser Canyon Gold Rush of 1858-1860 and after, Vancouver Island miners gathered on Mayne Island before rowing across Georgia Strait to the mainland of BC in search of their fortunes. The earliest homesteaders registered land claims in the Miners Bay area in 1859.

During the late 19th century, Mayne Island was the commercial and social centre of the Gulf Islands. The port at Miners Bay was always busy due to the steady stream of marine traffic travelling through Active Pass, the narrow, curving strait separating Mayne from Galiano Island to the north, which is the main ferry route between the Mainland and Vancouver Island today. The historic village at Miners Bay remains the commercial centre of the island, with the annual Fall Fair still being held at the old Agricultural Hall like so many years before. Miners Bay is also the site of the Springwater Lodge which was built in 1892 and remains the oldest continuously operated hotel in British Columbia. Nearby Active Pass still throbs with a steady stream of marine traffic, a bustling contrast to the island's quiet interior byways. Village Bay, with its BC Ferries terminal, has several late 19th-century to 1930s buildings. Active Pass is named after the American survey ship USCS Active, the first steam vessel to navigate the pass.

The Japanese-Canadian community on Mayne Island played a historical role in the island's economics and society from the turn of the 20th century until World War II. The community had close ties to the European-Canadian population throughout the Gulf Islands and was involved in major economic initiatives such as greenhouse farming. In 1941 the Japanese Canadians living on Mayne Island were interned by the government and resettled in New Denver for the duration of World War II. Many of the families would never return to the island after the loss of land and their community. Today, the Japanese Gardens, near Dinner Bay, are dedicated to the memory and legacy of the Mayne Island's Japanese-Canadian community.

The Mayne Island community holds a Farmers' Market every Saturday morning throughout the summer months. Islanders sell their local produce, handicrafts, baked goods, and art work.

Transportation

BC Ferries operates a vehicle and passenger scheduled ferry service from Tsawwassen (Vancouver) on the mainland and Swartz Bay (Victoria) on Vancouver Island as well as to the other major southern Gulf Islands. SeaAir Seaplanes operates a scheduled float plane service calling at Mayne Island from Vancouver downtown and the airport. Hitchhiking is common on the island in the summer and dedicated "car stops" for pick-ups are located along the major roadways.

Climate

The warmest month is August, the coldest month is December.

Parks and beaches
Gulf Islands National Park Reserve offers opportunities for boating, kayaking, hiking, wildlife viewing and picnicking. There is an easy   loop trail at Bennett Bay that leads to Campbell Point. Campbell Point features remnant old-growth forest and views of Georgeson Island. Bennett Bay has a sandy beach which is suitable for sunbathing and swimming. Georgina Point is the location of a historic lighthouse. Built in 1885, the Georgina Point lighthouse marks the entrance to Active Pass. Orca whales, harbour seals and seabirds can all be seen at Georgina Point.

References

External links

Mayne Island Community Portal - News, Real Estate, Information, Email
Mayne Island website
Mayne Island Community Chamber of Commerce website

Populated places in the Capital Regional District
Islands of the Gulf Islands
Unincorporated settlements in British Columbia